God Bless You, Amigo is a collection of home-recorded songs by The Felice Brothers. It was released via their website in 2012, allowing fans to choose how much to pay, with an initial minimum of $5.
The album includes eight traditional songs and 12 of the band's own songs that had not been recorded previously.

Track listing
"Sail Away Ladies" (Uncle Dave Macon) - 2:16
"Dream On" - 3:30
"How Long Must I Wait" - 3:57
"Jack of Diamonds" (Blind Lemon Jefferson) - 2:13
"Black Velvet Band" - 4:02
"Lincoln Continental" - 3:19
"Dead Dog" - 3:10
"Her Eyes Dart Round" - 3:48
"Red Mustang" - 4:35
"44 Special" - 3:20
"Panther at the Zoo" - 1:57
"Honey in the Rock" (The Carter Family) - 3:15
"Cumblerland Gap" (trad.) - 2:30
"Early Times" - 1:47
"The Mating of the Doves" - 3:49
"Been All Around This World" (trad.) - 1:56
"The Parting Glass" (trad.) - 2:43
"Mistral Boy" (trad.) - 3:02
"The Promised Land" - 4:28
"Gulf of Mexico" (trad.) - 2:36

References 

The Felice Brothers albums
2012 albums